Trpanj, is a municipality of Dubrovnik-Neretva County in south-eastern Croatia. According to the 2001 census, Trpanj has a population of 871. Croats make up 93.11% of the population.

History

Etymology

There is more than one theory about the origin of the name Trpanj. According to one, the name was derived from the Croatian verb trpjeti, meaning "to suffer." Another theory draws the origin of the name from δρεπάνη : drepánē, an Ancient Greek word for sickle, which is the shape formed by the cliffs surrounding the town's harbor. According to a third theory, the name was derived from the name of the ancient fortification called Tarpano or Tarponio, the remains of which can still be seen on the hill overlooking the harbor.  Finally, the sea cucumber is called a "trp" in Croatian, leading some to make the connection.

Early history

The area has been inhabited since ancient times. Examples of prehistoric pottery, evidence that the site may have been inhabited by an urban-type society, were found on the slopes of Gradina, the small hill overlooking the port. Other traces of prehistoric humans were found on the St. Roko hill. Life in the area may not have been easy as it is located between barren cliffs to the north and the Miloševica, Viter and Prvač Dol hills to the south.

The first traces of Roman occupation were discovered in 1922, when a mosaic was uncovered in a park under the Gradina hill. In 1963, walls of a Roman “villa rustica” were found, as well as a base of a Roman column and an inscription from the 2nd or 3rd century AD. When the Romans occupied the area they encountered Illyrians, who were dwelling on the slopes of Gradina. According to the Dubrovnik historian Jakov Lukarić, the ancient fortress, Tarpano or Tarponio, was destroyed by Julius Caesar while he was fighting the Illyrians. As a result, the old inhabitants of Trpanj took the three towers as the town emblem. Other evidence of Roman presence was covered over the centuries by a thick layer of soil carried over the centuries by the Potok brook.

During the Goth rule of Dalmatia in the 6th century, Byzantine emperor Justinian I built a series of defenses along the coast, including the one on the top of Gradina, in an attempt to reclaim the lands lost to invading tribes and to ensure safe passage of trade.
Throughout centuries the Neretva channel was a very important merchant sea route. Frequent changes of state boundaries never caused the traffic to stop. Greek vessels used the channel to transport ingredients for the production of incense to Corinth, while Romans mostly used it to trade wine in amphoras. Later Neretva princes imposed tributum pacis ("peace tribute")which meant that anyone trading in the area had to pay them a peace tribute.

On the remains of the ancient world the new Croatian inhabitants built their own monuments. For example, the first and most important church of medieval Trpanj, dedicated to St. Peter, was built on the remains of a Roman villa.

Changing rulers

After the death of Mihajlo Višević (910-930), the first known ruler of Zahumlje, Pelješac underwent frequent changes of rulers.

Samuil of Bulgaria (992-1018) ruled Pelješac, then Duklja in 1042, followed by prince Desa of Zahumlje in 1148.

In 1168 Zahumlje and Pelješac came under the rule of prince Miroslav of Zahumlje, brother of Stefan Nemanja of Serbia. He expelled bishop Donat from Ston and Orthodox priests arrived in Pelješac. The Catholic population was then served by the Benedictine monks from the island of Mljet.

In 1198 Zahumlje recognized the authority of the Hungarian Duke Andrew (1197–1204).

Towards the end of the 13th century the Bribir family came to control the area along with other Dalmatian lands, ruling over more land than any other national ruler before them. In 1322, when Mladen II Bribirski disappeared from politics, the territory of was taken over by the Serbian Branivojevic brothers. They were removed from power by Stephen II of Bosnia with the help of Ragusa in 1326. The Republic of Ragusa (Dubrovnik) initiated diplomatic action to gain international recognition of the newly occupied lands. This was achieved in 1333, with the assistance of the Serbian kings Dušan and Stjepan II Kotromanić. Ragusa also allied with the Hungarian king Louis the Great to ward off any other pretenders to the area. Pelješac remained in the political sphere of the Republic of Ragusa until its fall.

Under Ragusa

The Republic nobility divided the land among each other and passed laws stating that no one may own land on Pelješac unless he was a citizen of Ragusa, and no one may reside or work there unless he was a serf of the Republic. As a result, all inhabitants automatically became serfs. The serfs of the Republic, although having quite a few obligations, had the right to sail (in the Dubrovnik merchant fleet), be educated, do business and accumulate possessions. In contrast with the other two local superpowers which could have claimed the area, (Venice and the Ottoman Empire), the serfs were acquainted with their local lords and could communicate with them in Croatian. Hence the Republic enjoyed overwhelming support among the population.

In order to have the right to live in a house, every serf family with at least one male member over 16 years of age, had to perform services. Those included working the land for free, transporting the lord by rowing boat and carrying out other orders. The number of days that these services had to be performed varied until the Dubrovnik Senate in 1800 set it at 90 days a year. If a serf household had a garden they had to give the lord a lamb, 2 chickens, 2 chicks and 10 eggs. The price for the grazing of the public land was a dried pig's head. Serf daughters were sent to work as maids in noble families, thus bringing culture and fashion trends from the city to the countryside. Public schools started operating quite early in the Republic, since navigation and sailing required literacy.

Brotherhoods, which in the 13th century had a religious character, received a semi-legal status by the 15th century, and held responsibilities such as collecting port fees. Fishing brotherhoods, such as the one dedicated to St. Peter, always took a fisherman apostle as a patron saint.

Until 1343, when the captaincy was established in Orebić, the seat of authority for Peljesac was in Ston. From 1456 Trpanj had been administered by the newly established captaincy in Janjina. However, since Trpanj was on the coast, unlike Janjina, the Janjina captain spent most of his time in Trpanj, despite the fact that Janjina was more populous.

Lords of Trpanj

When Ragusan nobility divided Pelješac among each other in 1344, Trpanj was sectioned into 4 parts: two and a half were given to the brothers Dobre and Luka from the Gambe family and the brothers Marko and Petar from the Bucchia family received one and a half. Both of these families were in the maritime commerce business. In 1352 when Dobre Gambe died, his part went to his brother Luka and in turn when Luka died in 1358 he requested that his part be sold and the proceeds be given to the monastery in Ston. The Bucchia brothers also had no inheritors and their parts were sold at public auction in 1395 for 1501 perpers.
Trpanj became property of the Gradi family. The exact date is not known but it must have been before 24 February 1498, since a building contract with that date describes the construction of a stone house in Trpanj for Stjepan Gradi. Biagio Stefano Gradi left Trpanj to his son-in-law Jerolim Frano Gundulić. Hence the Gondola family came into possession of Trpanj on 16 November 1615. Due to a court order from 18 February 1626 the brothers i, Stefan and Frano Gundulić were ordered to return the dowry of their grandmother to her brothers Miho and Ivan Resti. To raise the money, the brothers sold half of their Trpanj possessions to Ivan Krste Benessa on 17 July 1632 for 1,590 ducats, stipulating that if in 8 years they manage to return that sum of money to the buyer, the sale will be annulled, which probably happened as Trpanj remained in the Gondola family.
When his brothers died, Biagio found himself sole proprietor of Trpanj, and in order to ensure that Trpanj as a whole remained in his family he made Trpanj an indivisible legal entity protected by a “fideicomis”, a sort of a testamentary trust.

Frano Gondola, who was an Austrian marshal, wrote from Vienna on 22 May 1672 to his friend Marco Bassegli to ask him to get the Republic to name him Duke and as a result to name Trpanj Dukedom of St. Michael of Trpanj. This was necessary because of his position in Vienna. Frano died in 1700 before being able to build a summer residence in Trpanj. Francesco Gondola left the residence in Trpanj to his son Francesco II, who died in Vienna in 1717, without male offspring.

In the spring of 1700 the Gondola family was sued in court by Slava, wife of Paolo Gozze, and the court ordered Trpanj to be divided in two. Although court documents clearly divide the land and property, the court order was never carried out and the town remained the Gondola fideicomis. Sigismondo was sued again, this time by his serfs from Trpanj, in the spring of 1741, for a variety of unlawful actions ranging from requiring free fishing to confiscation of boats and other property and interference in their commerce.

Sigismondo (*1682) died in 1758 leaving Trpanj to his son Sigismondo Domenico Gondola (1712–1800). In order to avoid constant lawsuits by his financially powerful serfs, he struck a deal on 4 July 1765 whereby the 70 Trpanj families were to pay a sum of money for the following 25 years, instead of performing services or giving gifts to Gundulić. Only the gift of olive oil still had to be delivered to the landlord. The sum of money had to be paid by each family before the celebration of St. Michael's. That contract was signed a second time for another period of 25 years when the first one expired.

Sigismondo Domenico Gondola, who was to die in 1800, had no inheritors so he adopted his sister's (Katarina) son Frano Agostino Ghetaldi in 1787. In 1807, the last Count Gondola, Sigismondo Domenico, litigated in the courts of Dubrovnik the fideicomis instituted by Biagio Gondola in 1649 by Pietro Ignazio Gio. Sorgo-Cerva and Bernardo Caboga by the possession of Trpanj against Sigismondo Ghetaldi-Gondola. 

But finally he was succeeded by the sons of Frano Agostino Ghetaldi and Catterina Gondola, Frano Ghetaldi and his sons: Sigismondo Ghetaldi-Gondola (1795–1860) and Mateo Ghetaldi-Gondola (born in 1797), and Trpanj was left to Sigismondo who was later named Baron and podestà of Ragusa for 13 years. He had 3 children: Frano, Gino (1835–1891) and Maria (born 1837). Trpanj remained the property of the Ghetaldi-Gondola family and its inhabitants would pay the landlord a fixed sum of money every year instead of the traditional services and gifts in nature until the Trpanj residents, the first on Pelješac, decided to legally buy their town from the landlord and relieve themselves of official serfdom in 1856.

Main sights

Gradina

On the small hill just above the port was a fortress of a considerable size, and its northern walls are especially well preserved. The total length of the walls is 60 m. The location, plan and wall construction indicate that it was built in late antiquity, probably in the time of the Byzantine emperor Justinian who built a series of fortresses along the Croatian coast to protect maritime commerce, after having driven the Goths out of Dalmatia. The fortress has not yet been analyzed by archeologists. A staircase and path that lead to the fortress and the observatory was built in 1936 although it is presently hard to gain access to, due to residential buildings that make it less obvious.

St. Peter's Church

Until 1922, remains of the oldest church, dedicated to St. Peter "on the shore," could be found in the park in front of the former fire station. In front of the church was a walled cemetery where burials were carried out until 1904.

The church had all the details of pre-Romanesque construction just like mot Croatian churches built between the 9th and 12th centuries. It was 4.62 m long, 3.8 m wide and about 5 m high.

This early Middle Ages church was elongated probably in the baroque era, with a wider nave. Hence the original church became simply the altar section of a larger church. The stone arch that was inserted where the old church met the expansion, was done in a shallow relief and the stones from this arch were later used in 1957 in the renovation of St. Roch's Church.

From the visit archives of the Ston Bishop Ambroz Gučetić from 4 July 1621 it is known that the church has a bell tower with bells but it is empty. It has no roof or doors. The bishop ordered the town to restore the church so that it may again be put to use. The roof had probably burned down in 1591 during a pirate attack which were frequent in that year. The same bishop consecrated a restored church and urged the residents to keep the main altar in good condition. He only mentioned the main altar as other altars were the responsibility of the individual families that had built them. Hence it can be found in records that don Agostino di Agostino in his will read on 14 August 1679 instructs his brothers to decorate and take care of his altar in the church. At the end of August 1679 the church was inspected again and new orders were given to continue the restoration that had not yet been done to satisfaction.

The Trpanj born bishop Dživo Natali inspected the church in 1684 and forbade mass services till main altar renovations were not carried out. The Trpanj people often left money for the church in their wills as can be seen in old archives. When the church became a ruin, it was used as a cemetery, so that the original 9th-century chapel reappeared but with no doors which accelerated its ruin. Two altars from the church, entrance stones and the classical Rosetta stone were moved to the St. Michael's Church. The 4th altar was moved in 1857 to Our Lady of Mount Carmel Church.

St. Peter and Paul Church, formerly St. Michael's Church

The year 1799 was engraved on a tomb in this church so that year was taken as the year of construction. Stefano Gondola in his 20 October 1647 will leaves instructions for the building Our Lady of Mount Carmel Church and he asks that a religious church item be made of gold for St. Michael's Church. The Vručica priest don Juraj Gabrić confirms having received the gold from the state treasury and those are the oldest references found for this church.

That was at first a very small church that was not mentioned in any of the bishop's visits from 1621 to 1805 whereas the little St. Anthony's Church is mentioned. That would mean that St. Michael's was either smaller or not in use. Even in 1800 it is not mentioned in a separate list while all other churches are named.

In the land registry map from 1836, the church is labeled as St. Michael's Church. It was a small church with probably one wooden altar displaying a group of saints: St Michael with a scale, to the right St. Peter with keys and to the left St. Paul. Above them was the virgin Mary surrounded by angels and flowers. This altar probably had the pendant of St. Michael and Peter that is now in St. Anthony's Church.

The main altar was built in 1849 by Domenico Bertapelle a famous altar maker from Vrboska. The other two altars, the entrance stones and the classical window Rosetta stone came from St. Peter's Church. Until 1902 the door and window were at the front of the church which was decorated by stone bell-niche with 3 bells. This niche was damaged by thunder in 1858. In 1854 a new altar decoration was purchased showing St. Liberan, St. Blaise, and St. Jovinian protector of olives. This was replaced in 1907 by a statue of St. Liberan which was a gift of Ivan Čibilić, who was living in Alexandria.

The statue of the Lady of Rosary was purchased in 1855 from Italy and a lithography of the statue was made in Verona to be used as the town seal. The statue was brought to Trpanj on 20 May 1855 and that date was celebrated as a holiday until 1912. The king Franz Joseph I visited the church on 11 May 1875 while on his tour of Dalmatia.

Prince Joseph II of Liechtenstein who frequently came to Trpanj to hunt for čaglje (a wild dog native of Pelješac resembling a hyena) made a gift of 2 bells in 1888. Since the niche could not support the large bells, they were taken down in 1897 and hung next to the church. The town then decided to expand the church and build  new bell tower. The prince of Liechtenstein contributed 150 fiorns and the town 2000 crowns. The work started in 1902, and the new roof and sacristy were completed in November 1904 and the new bell tower in 1905. The church and 5 new bells were consecrated on 28 April 1907 by bishop Marcelic. The marble statues of St. Peter and Paul were made in 1907 in the Bilinic workshop in Split. In 1912 began the construction of the staircase leading to the church and in 1916 the space around it was paved. The old fence wall consisting of benches was replaced with the current stone columns between 1917 and 1918 thanks to father Dinko Suljaga. The paintings in the church were made by the local painter Frano Ferenca between 1929 and 1930.

Our Lady of Mount Carmel Church

The Dubrovnik nobleman and lord of Trpanj Stefan Gundulić-Gondola, in his will dated 7 October 1645 instructed that a church be built in Trpanj. He insisted that church be a replica of the Holy Family chapel in Loreta. Furthermore, he instructed a priest to be hired and housed in Trpanj to serve daily mass for the deliverance of his soul. Stefan Gundulić-Gondola (the uncle of writer and Duke Ivan Gundulić) died in 1647 and the first mention of the church is found in the bishop's visitation of 29 April 1679. It is noted that the church suffers from damage from humidity so instructions are given for two windows to be equipped with iron bars to allow free flow of air. Furthermore, since the painting above the altar was also seriously damaged because it has no frame, the bishop orders a wooden frame be built. From this it is obvious that there were previous visitations and that the church is not completely new. The altar is built in the renaissance style, and the House of Gundula crest can be found on the base of the columns. In time the painting was replaced by a statue and parts of the painting representing souls in purgatory were saved and can be seen under the statue of the Lady of Carmel. According to professor Grgo Gamulin the painting shows signs of 18th-century Venetian painting resembling Piazzetto and Benkovic. The painting on either side of the statue were made by the amateur painter Frano Kaer from Makarska in 1848.

In 1679 the bishop carries out sacraments in this church which might indicate that it was in better shape than St. Peter's Church. In 1687 there is a mention of the priest of Our Lady of Mount Carmel Church which would indicate that the priest's house had already been built. Names of some of the priests are also known. For instance, father Petar Milošević from Popova died in 1753 and was succeeded by father Luca Giovanelli, who on the 22 February 1758 informed the senate to find a replacement as he will be departing, leaving the keys of the church and house to the chancellor D'Agostino. Bishop's visitations in 1802 and 1805 make no mention of the church which suggests it was not in use.

After the fall of the Republic of Ragusa, the priest uses it as the primary school as can be found in the city records of 1836. In 1848 the church was repaired and put back into use. In the spring of 1850 it was thoroughly renovated and its walls were made higher. An altar in the renaissance style, although built after that period, was brought from the old St. Peter's Church in 1857. That altar is there today as the altar of St. Anthony. There is a baroque relief depicting a cross with whips on the outer back wall of the church. The town council built a dome on the church and installed a public clock and was responsible for its accuracy following a contract signed in 1874.

St. Roch's Church

The Saint Roch's Church, dedicate to the protector from leprosy, was built in the first half of the 17th century over the remains of an older church on the highest hill overlooking Trpanj and the Neretva channel. The 1621 bishop's visitation does not mention the church whereas the 1679 visitation notes that the bishop inspected the church and noted that there is a new painting of St. Roch in it. In 1684 the Trpanj born bishop Natali forbade mass services because the church was not properly equipped. Around 1700 the town people planted olives around the church and surrounded it by a fence wall. When in 1739 the children's cemetery became full in the town church, a cemetery for children was made in St. Roch's Church.

Bishop Milković in his 1751 visit notes that the church has a well equipped altar, a good silver chalice, and all other items of cult. The altar was built in the neo-renaissance style and ha two small statues: St. Roko and Lady of Health. The older statue of St. Roko was replaced in 1897 by a new 90 cm one brought from St. Ulrich for 300 florins. The space between the altar and the walls is covered on both ides by two paintings. The one on the right shows the pope St. Sylvester baptizing Constantine the Great and the left shows St. Blaise holding Dubrovnik in his arm and Trpanj in the background.  Both of these copies of older paintings were done by Frano Ferenca. The bell for the church was made in 1804.

During the epidemic of cholera in Metković, in 1884, the Trpanj townspeople vowed to repair the church and build a new bell tower. Hence in place of the older bell niche a bell tower was built in the neo-Roman style and at the same time a space in front of the church was built and surrounded by a wall. All work was completed by 1895.

St. Anthony's Church

An inscription above the church states that it was built as a result of a vow made by Antonio Simonetti. His son, father Antun, was the priest of Vručica from 1731 to 1749. Antun Sr. owned stocks in several ships along with his brother. The church has a baroque altar with a painting above of no artistic value as it is a copy by the amateur painter Ilija Antunovic from 1960 of a previous damaged painting. From the bishop's visitation in 1751 it states that the church is fully equipped with a silver chalice, two chandeliers, a lamp and two bells. In 1845 the brotherhood of Forgiveness was founded and took the church as its chapel. The mosaic on the floor dates from that period as can be seen from the inscription that reads 1847.

St. Nicholas's Church

An inscription above the church states that it was built as a result of a vow made by the sailor Kleme Cvitanovic in 1840. The inscription also says in Croatian: “buduci da ga bili pokrili valovi, od smrti osloboden” meaning “delivered from death having been covered by the waves [sea].”  Kleme Cvitanović (1799–1877) was born in Drasnica not far from Makarska but married Frana Iveta from Trpanj and relocated there. He was owner of 9 stocks of the Peljesac Maritime Association (1867–1869) and of the house called Vatican.

He had no inheritors, so he left all possessions to his wife's family and they in turn left the church to the Trpanj mother church.

The church has a wooden altar, with St. Nicholas and St. Liberan. The church has a bell niche. The last restoration dates from 1988. This church, dedicated to the protector of sailors, was built at the onset of the golden age of Trpanj's sail boats specializing in mall coastal commerce.

The chapel of the lady of Grace

On the small hill to the left of the St. Peter and Paul Church, is the smallest church in Trpanj referred to by the locals as the chapel. From the outside it is only 213 cm long and 158 cm wide. It was built by Franić Nesanović-Jura in 1865. The association for the improvement of the town began the construction of a staircase in 1936. An observatory in front of the church fenced by a stone colonnade was completed by 1940.

The cemetery

A new cemetery was built based on the winning design from a competition in a Vienna newspaper. The care with which the cemetery was built is a testament to the respect the Trpanj populace paid to its ancestors. Nikola Jerić, who was the chairman of the council in charge of the construction of the new cemetery, is credited with the current appearance of the cemetery. The town council decided on 25 January 1900 to set aside 1,956 crowns for the new cemetery, and that the first 10 plots be sold at public auction for 120 crowns. All other plots were to cost 24 crowns.

The statue above the Tere Ferri tomb is of particular interest as it is the work of Ivan Rendić from 1903. The Narodni List (the national Paper) in its no.89 edition from 7 November 1903 describes the marble work of art as both artistically pleasing and patriotic, as it displays elements from Croatian folklore.

Other notable monuments can be found in the cemetery, in particular statues from the workshop of Pavle Bilinić in Split.

The town council decided on 20 December 1902 to forbid further burials in the old cemetery of St. Peter. On 15 June 1906 the construction of the chapel of the Holy Cross began on the site of the new cemetery. The chapel roof was badly constructed and the chapel suffered from humidity requiring restorations in 1924 as its interior had seriously degraded. Further renovations were carried out in 2000 with the inclusion of a communal repository for the remains of bones transported from the old cemetery.

Municipality
The list of inhabited places with their respective populations in the Trpanj municipality, as of census 2001, includes:

 Trpanj, 707
 Gornja Vrućica, 62
 Duba Pelješka, 54
 Donja Vrućica, 48

Economy

Fisheries

Fishing in Trpanj is an activity as old as the town itself. During the Republic of Dubrovnik, the fishermen were obliged to transport salt from Mali Ston to Neretva, for which they built special boats, called “solarica.” These were small boats with a smaller draft. By the decision of the Grand Council dated 26 April 1560 fishermen that transported salt were absolved from the very labor-intensive work in the salt evaporation ponds.

By the decision of the Small council, no owner of a fishing vessel with nets could get a fishing permit if he did not have 12 sailors, 3 smaller boats and 2 night fishing lights. Fishing's importance is evidenced from a letter from Matija Andricic who wrote to the Council in 1765 to be absolved from paying taxes that year as the total catch did not exceed 50 barrels.

In the 18th century owners of fishing vessels were from the following families: Augustinović, Andricić, Balovi, Barbica, Barac, Bergando, Belin, Butirić, Certić, Franković, Ferri, Iveta, Jerić, Klarić, Kresić, Kulišić, Mirković, Nesanović, Senko, Simonetti, Skoko and Zimić.

Records show the following numbers for fishing vessels

Fishing vessels through the years

According to a court order from 1741, Trpanj fishermen were obliged to go fishing 4 days in a row for their landlord Gundulic while he was residing in Trpanj for his needs. Gundulic was required to pay for this fish as in the past he paid nothing.

In 1815 there are 27 boats of 4 tons, 24 boats of 5 tons (called leuti) and 11 ships of 1.5 tons.

Other than sardine fishing, in Trpanj, the fishermen also extracted corals, in particular towards the end of the 17th and the beginning of the 18th centuries in the waters around Lastovo.

Taking into account the number if inhabitants, Trpanj in the 19th century was probably the strongest fishing community in the southern Adriatic.

Sports
NK Faraon Trpanj

Navigation

Trpanj was a center of coastal navigation on Pelješac. Sailor were frequently exposed to dangers. For example, in 1660 Martin Marin Medovic from Trpanj was captured in Tunis, and in 1755 pirates captured Nikola Franković.

In February 1669, the Ragusan Senate orders that officials be sent to Trpanj to bring two sail ships with crew because they have not answered the call to transport construction material for the restoration of the place.

From 1677 to 1797 there were 41 known sailors from Trpanj in the Venetian fleet and two known ship commanders Grga Ivana Frankovic and Mato Nika Mrčić.

In the mid 18th century, on Dubrovnik ships navigating outside the Adriatic the following sailors from Trpanj could be found: Ante and Justin Auustinovic, Simun Andricic, Stijepo and Vicko Barbica, Andrija, Mato and Petar Certić, Luka nd Peter Despot, Ivan, Mato, Nikola and Petar Ferri, Antun, Duro, Ivan and Luka Franković, Ivan Iveta, Ante and Tomo Jerić, Petar Keko, Ivan and Baldo Krešić, Antun, Petar and Mato Marković, Ivan, Petar and Mato Mrčić, Rade and Baldo Nesanović, and Ivan Sirovica-Dolica.

Many Trpanj priests were co-owners of sailships notably: Miho Fabrelli Iveta, Antun Simonetti, Mato Nesanović, Nikola Augustinović, Baldo Kresic, Andrija Kalais and Ivan Klaric-Mirkovic.

The sail ship “Nimfa” 104 barrels, was purchased in 1801 by the Jerić, Barac, Zimić and Ferri families. That ship was confiscated in 1804.

Trpanj was a major export port for salted fish in the Republic of Ragusa. In the 18th century Trpanj imported salted fish from Sucuraj which was under Venetian authority and exported it along with its fish. In the 18th century, in Senigallia near Ancona, merchants from Trpanj had their own warehouses for storing fish and other goods during the local fair. Trpanj sail ships were returning with imported goods from the far away European colonies, cloth and ceramics. Commerce was booming at the time and the merchant fleet was constantly on the rise. In a good year, Trpanj could generate over 30,000 florins.

The last sail ship from Trpanj was sold in 1920.

Famous people 

 Ena Begović, actress (1960–2000)
 Mia Begović, actress
 Stjepan Ivanišević, Minister of Justice: 2001–2003

See also 
Croatia
Dalmatia
Republic of Ragusa
House of Gundulić
House of Getaldić

References 

 All factual information in this article is based on paraphrased and summarised translations of the 1989 book in Croatian "Trpanj proslost, sadasnjost, spomenici" (Trpanj Past, Present, Monuments) by Frano Glavina.

External links 

Trpanj.com (Many photographs of Trpanj)
PeljesacInfo-Trpanj (Information site)
Trpanj Tourist Board (Tourist board site in English and Croatian)
Trpanj Net  (Information site)

Populated places in Dubrovnik-Neretva County
Municipalities of Croatia
Populated coastal places in Croatia